Independent Division of Anhui Provincial Military District(1st Formation) was formed in December 1964 from the 540th Infantry Regiment and 560th Artillery Regiment of the disbanding 180th Army Division. The division was then composed of 3 infantry regiments (1st to 3rd).

In June 1966 the division was renamed as 1st Independent Division of Anhui Provincial Military District after 2nd Independent Division of Anhui Provincial Military District's formation.

From September 1967 to November 14th 1969 it was put under command of 12th Army Corps, after which the division returned to Anhui Provincial Military District's control.

On March 25th 1975, the division exchanged its designation and position with 1st Independent Division of Zhejiang Provincial Military District and became the second formation of 1st Independent Division of Zhejiang Provincial Military District().

The division was then stationed in Zhuji, Zhejiang.

In May 1976 the division was renamed as Independent Division of Zhejiang Provincial Military District() following 2nd Independent Division of Zhejiang Provincial Military District (People's Republic of China)'s disbandment. Artillery Regiment of the  disbanding 74th Army Division was attached to the division.

In December 1980 the division was disbanded.

References

IZ1
Military units and formations established in 1964
Military units and formations disestablished in 1980